The William Christian Krumbein Medal is the highest award given alternate years by the International Association for Mathematical Geosciences (IAMG) to senior scientists for career achievement, which includes (a) distinction in application of mathematics or informatics in the earth sciences, (b) service to the IAMG, and (c) support to professions involved in the earth sciences. There is no stipulated preference for fields of application within the earth sciences. The William Christian Krumbein Medal, named after William Christian Krumbein, was established in 1976.

Recipients
Source: IAMG

 1976 John C. Griffiths 
 1977 Walther Schwarzacher 
 1978 Frederik P. Agterberg
 1979 Richard A. Reyment 
 1980 Andrei B. Vistelius 
 1981 Daniel F. Merriam 
 1982 Danie G. Krige 
 1983 Georges Matheron (Declined to receive the medal)
 1984 Felix Chayes
 1985 John W. Harbaugh 
 1986 John C Davis 
 1987 Michel David
 1988 E. H. Timothy Whitten
 1989 André G. Journel
 1990 Zhao Pengda
 1991 Vaclav Nemec
 1992 Richard B. McCammon
 1993 DeVerle P. Harris
 1994 Dmitrii A. Rodionov
 1995 John Aitchison
 1996 Jan Harff
 1998 Graeme Bonham-Carter
 2000 Richard J. Howarth
 2002 Michael Ed. Hohn
 2004 Ricardo A. Olea
 2006 Vera Pawlowsky-Glahn
 2008 Qiuming Cheng
 2010 Lawrence J. Drew
 2012 Eric Grunsky
 2014 Jef Caers
 2016 Peter Dowd
 2018 Roussos Dimitrakopoulos
 2020 Jaime Gómez-Hernández

See also

 List of geology awards
 List of geophysics awards
 List of mathematics awards

References 

Awards of the International Association for Mathematical Geosciences
Awards established in 1976